This is a list of defunct airlines of Azerbaijan.

See also
 List of airlines of Azerbaijan
 List of airports in Azerbaijan
 List of defunct airlines

References

External links

Azerbaijan
Airlines
Airlines, defunct
Airlines